This is a list of equipment used by the Armed Forces of the Republic of Uzbekistan.

Ground forces 
Reportedly, Uzbek armed forces small arms include the AK-47, AK-12, Glock pistol, AK-74, Dragunov sniper rifle, Makarov pistol and PK machine gun.

Air force

References 

Military of Uzbekistan
Uzbekistan